Mosquitoxylum is a monotypic genus of trees in the subfamily Anacardioideae of the cashew and sumac family Anacardiaceae. It contains the single species Mosquitoxylum jamaicense, which grows naturally from southern Mexico to Ecuador and also in Jamaica.

References

Anacardiaceae
Trees of Campeche
Trees of Chiapas
Trees of Oaxaca
Trees of Quintana Roo
Trees of Tabasco
Trees of Veracruz
Trees of Central America
Trees of western South America
Trees of Jamaica
Monotypic Sapindales genera
Anacardiaceae genera